John Mulroy may refer to:

John H. Mulroy, the first county executive of Onondaga County, New York 
John Mulroy (footballer), Irish footballer